Lise Klaveness (born 19 April 1981) is a Norwegian lawyer and former footballer who played 73 matches for Norway's national team between 2002 and 2011. She is currently the president of the Norwegian Football Federation. 

Since assuming her leadership role in March of 2022 Klaveness has advocated for change within Fifa, particularly as related to the upcoming 2022 World Cup in Qatar. In response to reports of harsh labor practices which led to the deaths of thousands of migrant workers, Klaveness pushed for safe conditions and fair pay for migrant workers. Klaveness has also spoken out against Fifa's decision to allow Qatar to host the Cup, citing the country's human rights violations including anti-LGBT laws and societal oppression of women.

Club career
Her clubs include IL Sandviken, Bjørnar (now Arna-Bjørnar) (2000), FK Athene Moss (2001), Asker (2002–2005, 2008) and, in 2006/07, Umeå IK where she was vice-captain for the 2007 season.  At the end of her time in Umeå she went on holiday to West Africa where she contracted serious food poisoning with a body temperature of 42 degrees C.  In her own words, "I met the man with the scythe" (i.e. the Grim Reaper).

In 2008, she returned to Norway and played again for Asker, and was also the club's physical trainer as well as qualifying as a lawyer and beginning full-time work for a law firm in Oslo.

At the end of 2008 when Asker became bankrupt most first-team players including Klaveness transferred to Stabæk IF, the nearby top sports club, to set up Stabæk Fotball Kvinner (SFK).  Stabæk therefore became the first Norwegian club to have men's and women's teams playing in the two elite divisions, the Tippeligaen and the Toppserien. Despite retiring from international football in 2011 Klaveness was contracted to continue playing for SFK in 2012. But she announced her retirement from all football in March 2012 after her enthusiasm waned.

International career
Klaveness played in Norway's team in the 2003 FIFA Women's World Cup tournament in the USA, and in the UEFA Women's Euro 2005, also known as the European Cup competition, played in England.

She played on the Norwegian team that finished fourth at the 2007 FIFA Women's World Cup in China, but retired from the Norwegian national team at the end of the 2007 season having played 51 matches and scored six goals. The manner of Klaveness' departure was controversial, as coach Bjarne Berntsen told her she was no longer required in the airport lounge immediately after the long flight home from the World Cup in China. This shocked and upset Klaveness and some of her teammates. She was recalled in 2009 after Eli Landsem replaced Bertsen as the team's trainer.

In October 2009 she was recalled to the women's national team for two matches in the qualification stage of the 2011 FIFA Women's World Cup.  Eventually she completed a further 22 matches for Norway.

Post-playing career
As a specialist in employment law Klaveness has sometimes been involved with disputes between football clubs and their employees. She also served on the management committee of NISO, the union for sports people in Norway.

Klaveness announced her retirement from football in March 2012. Further to her career as an attorney, she is also serving as a deputy judge in the Oslo court. Since her playing retirement, Klaveness has also worked as a television football pundit. She was a studio commentator for NRK's coverage of the 2014 [men's] World Cup, after which she was subject to sexist criticism by internet trolls.

In 2018, Klaveness was hired as director of elite football in the Norwegian Football Federation (NFF). On 7 March 2022, Klaveness was elected as Norwegian Football Federation (NFF) president. She is the first woman to lead NFF in their 120-year organization history. She represents her childhood club IL Kvernbit.

During FIFA's Congress in Doha in March 2022, Klaveness gave a speech arguing that the international football community should do more to "help migrant workers in Qatar, more to protect LGBTQ+ supporters at the World Cup, more to make the global game welcoming to all". Both the speech and the trip to Doha itself, had to be cleared by the Norwegian government. Since Klaveness is married to a woman, Ingrid Camilla Fosse Sæthre, she risked 7 years in prison in Qatar just by traveling there. The conclusion from the Norwegian Ministry of Foreign Affairs and Embassy, was that as long as she did all of her statements in public, it should be safe for her to travel.

Soon afterwards, Fritt Ord announced that they would award Klaveness the Fritt Ord Honorary Award for the speech.

References

External links
 Lise Klaveness's speech at the FIFA Congress in March 2022
 
  
 Stabæk club profile 

1981 births
Living people
People from Meland
Norwegian women's footballers
Norway women's international footballers
Arna-Bjørnar players
Stabæk Fotball Kvinner players
Norwegian expatriate women's footballers
21st-century Norwegian lawyers
Umeå IK players
Damallsvenskan players
Norwegian association football commentators
Asker Fotball (women) players
SK Brann Kvinner players
Athene Moss players
Expatriate women's footballers in Sweden
Norwegian expatriate sportspeople in Sweden
Norwegian women lawyers
Women's association football midfielders
Women's association football forwards
2007 FIFA Women's World Cup players
2003 FIFA Women's World Cup players
Norwegian sports executives and administrators